Eugenia Calosso (21 April 1878 – after 1914) was an Italian conductor and composer. She was born in Turin, Piedmont, and studied composition with Giovanni Cravero. She began her career as a conductor at the Casino Municipale in San Remo and continued concert tours of Europe until 1914.

Calosso wrote madrigals, lieder, orchestral suites, and instrumental works for violin and piano. She wrote one opera, Vespero with a libretto by Ernesto Ragazzoni.

References

1878 births
20th-century deaths
Year of death uncertain
20th-century classical composers
Italian music educators
Women classical composers
Italian classical composers
Musicians from Turin
20th-century Italian composers
20th-century Italian conductors (music)
Women music educators
20th-century women composers